Ruby is an unincorporated community in Copiah County, Mississippi, United States.

History
Ruby was first settled in 1850 and named for the daughter of the first store owner, Albert Gates. The community was also home to a sawmill and school. Many of the settlers moved to Hopewell after a railroad and depot were built there in 1909.

Ruby was home to a pharmacist in 1916.

A post office operated under the name Ruby from 1892 to 1908.

References

Unincorporated communities in Copiah County, Mississippi
Unincorporated communities in Mississippi